Mercedes Cabral (born August 10, 1986) is a Filipino actress. She is best known for starring in Philippine arthouse and independent films, notably those by Brillante Mendoza such as Serbis, Kinatay, Captive, and Thy Womb. She also appeared in the South Korean film Thirst directed by Park Chan-wook. In 2021, she appeared in Huwag Kang Mangamba. She played the main antagonist role Agatha, a wicked stepmother of Joy, which is played by Francine Diaz. In 2016, she appeared in a Phil Giordano's award winning short film SUPOT.

Filmography
Apag (2023)
Culion (2019)
Nightshift (2019)
Pandanggo sa Hukay (2019)
Aurora (2018)
I'm Drunk, I Love You (2017)
Oro (2016)
Ma' Rosa (2016)
SUPOT (2016)
Rosita (2014)
Serpent Sword and the Betrayal (2014)
Force of Angel (2014)
The Deadline (2014)
Pedro Calungsod: Batang Martir (2013)
Bingoleras (2013)
Transit (2013)
Playtime (2013)
Bad Romance (2013)
Ad Ignorantiam (2012)
Colossal Woman (2012)
Hunger Pangs (short film, 2012)
Aberya (2012)
Mater Dolorosa (2012)
Limang Dipang Tao (2012)
Ginger and Cumin (short film, 2012)
Biktima (2012)
Thy Womb (2012) 
Imik (2012)
The Healing (2012)
Ang Nawawala (2012)
Captive (2012)
Crossroads (2012) 
Di ingon 'nato (2011) 
Dog Show (2012)
Pilgrim Lovers (2011)
Ligo na Ü, Lapit na Me (2011)
The Woman in the Septic Tank (2011)
Liberacion (2011)
Shake, Rattle and Roll 12 (segment "Punerarya", 2010)
The Night Infinite (2010)
Ang Babae sa Sementeryo (2010)
Gayuma (2010) 
Si Techie, si Teknoboy, at si Juana B (2010)
Blood Ties (2010)
Garden of Eve (segment "Minsan May Isang Puta", 2010) 
Sakit (short film, 2010)
Babae ako (short film, 2009)
Soliloquy (2009)
Panahon na (2009)
Latak (2009)
Karera (2009)
Tigasan (2009) 
The Rapture of Fe (2009)
Kinatay (2009)
Thirst (2009) 
1017: Sa paglaya ng aking salita (2009) 
Padyak (2009)
Booking (2009) 
Loophole (2009) 
Chronicle of Wasted Lives (2009)
Serbis (2008)

Television

References

External links

 
 

Filipino film actresses
1986 births
Living people
Star Magic
Actresses from Manila
University of the Philippines Diliman alumni